Miguel Passi (28 March 1923 – 1992) was an Argentine cyclist. He competed in the tandem event at the 1948 Summer Olympics.

References

External links
 

1923 births
1992 deaths
Argentine male cyclists
Olympic cyclists of Argentina
Cyclists at the 1948 Summer Olympics
Place of birth missing